Coconympha is a genus of moth in the family Gelechiidae. It contains the species Coconympha iriarcha, which is found in south-western India.

The larvae feed on the leaves of Cocos nucifera.

References

Gelechiinae
Taxa named by Edward Meyrick
Moth genera